Callanafersy is a stone ringfort (cashel) and National Monument located in County Kerry, Ireland.

Location

History
The cashel was built around the 7th century AD as a defended farmstead.

Description
This is a circular stone ringfort (caiseal).

References

National Monuments in County Kerry
Archaeological sites in County Kerry